Quercus treubiana is a member of the Quercus (oak) genus, placed in subgenus Cerris, section Cyclobalanopsis. It is found in the tropical mountain forests of Borneo and Sumatra at altitudes between 600 and 2200m. It is named for Melchior Treub, 1851–1910, who was until 1909 Director of the Bogor Botanical Gardens, Indonesia. It was first formally named by Karl Otto von Seemen in 1906 in the Bulletin de Département de l’Agriculture aux Indes Néerlandaises (Buitenzorg / Bogor). It is also been referred to as Cyclobalanopsis treubiana (Seemen) (see: Schottky, Bot. Jahrb. Syst. 47: 648 (1912)).

References

treubiana
Flora of Sumatra
Trees of Borneo
Flora of the Borneo montane rain forests